Graham Clapham (born 23 September 1947) is an English former professional footballer who played as a midfielder.

Playing career
Clapham began his career with Newcastle United, but left for Shrewsbury Town in August 1967 without any league appearances to his name. He spent more than four years with the Shrews but in January 1972 he was allowed to join Chester on loan. He marked his Chester debut by scoring in a 1–1 draw with Southport and he was signed on a permanent basis at end of his loan period.

He began the 1972–73 season as a regular in the Chester side, playing in an 8–2 demolition of Peterborough United early in the season. However, his appearances became less frequent as the season wore on and at the end of the season he dropped into non–league football with Grantham Town.

He is the father of former Premier League player Jamie Clapham and his father in law, Bert Wilkinson, was also a footballer. Since finishing his playing career, Clapham has lived in Lincoln and regularly watched Jamie play.

External links
Chester 1972–73 team picture featuring Clapham
The Independent article on Jamie and Graham Clapham

References

1947 births
Living people
Sportspeople from Lincoln, England
English footballers
English Football League players
Association football midfielders
Newcastle United F.C. players
Shrewsbury Town F.C. players
Chester City F.C. players
Grantham Town F.C. players